Moroni Olsen (June 27, 1889November 22, 1954) was an American actor.

Life and career

Olsen was born in Ogden, Utah to Latter-day Saint parents Edward Arenholt Olsen and Martha ( Hoverholst) Olsen, who named him after the Moroni found in the Book of Mormon. His father was Bishop of the Fourth Ward of Ogden.

Olsen studied at Weber Stake Academy, the predecessor of Weber State University.  He then went to study at the University of Utah, where one of his teachers was Maud May Babcock.  During World War I, he sold war bonds for the United States Navy. He also studied and performed in the eastern United States around this time. 

In 1923, Olsen organized the "Moroni Olsen Players" out of Ogden.  They performed at both Ogden's Orpheum Theatre and at various other locations spread from Salt Lake City to Seattle.

After working on Broadway, he made his film debut in a 1935 adaptation of The Three Musketeers. He later played a different role in a 1939 comedy version of the story, starring Don Ameche as D'Artagnan and the Ritz Brothers as three dimwitted lackeys who are forced to substitute for the musketeers, who have drunk themselves into a stupor.  He appeared in scores of films during his career.

His most famous role was the voice of the Slave in The Magic Mirror in Walt Disney's Snow White and the Seven Dwarfs (1937). Olsen provided the voice of the senior angel in It's a Wonderful Life.  His roles before the camera include a Secret Service officer in Alfred Hitchcock's 1946 film Notorious and the father-in-law of Elizabeth Taylor in the film comedies Father of the Bride (1950) and Father's Little Dividend (1951).

Olsen was an active member of the Church of Jesus Christ of Latter-day Saints, being a teacher of youth in the Hollywood Ward. He also was director of the Pilgrimage Play of Hollywood for several years.

Olsen died on November 22, 1954, of a heart attack at the age of 65. He is buried in the Ogden City Cemetery.

Broadway roles

 Mary of Scotland (1933) as John Knox

Selected filmography

The Three Musketeers (1935) as Porthos
Annie Oakley (1935) as William 'Buffalo Bill' Cody
Seven Keys to Baldpate (1935) as Mayor Jim Cargan
We're Only Human (1935) as Inspector J.R. Curran
Yellow Dust (1936) as Missouri
The Farmer in the Dell (1936) as Chester Hart
Two in Revolt (1936) as Cyrus Benton
The Witness Chair (1936) as Lieutenant Poole
M'Liss (1936) as Jake
Mary of Scotland (1936) as John Knox
Grand Jury (1936) as Davis, Taylor's Bodyguard
Mummy's Boys (1936) as Dr. Edward Sterling
The Plough and the Stars (1936) as Irish Leader
The Soldier and the Lady (1937) as Tartar Chief (voice, uncredited)
The Life of Emile Zola (1937) as Capt. Guignet (uncredited)
The Last Gangster (1937) as Detective Danny Shea (uncredited)
Manhattan Merry-Go-Round (1937) as Jonathan (uncredited)
Adventure's End (1937) as First Mate Rand Husk
Snow White and the Seven Dwarfs (1937) as Magic Mirror (voice, uncredited)
Gold Is Where You Find It (1938) as Senator Hearst
Kidnapped (1938) as Douglas
Marie Antoinette (1938) as Bearded Leader of the People (uncredited)
That Certain Age (1938) as Fullerton's Associate (uncredited)
There Goes My Heart (1938) as Fisherman (uncredited)
Submarine Patrol (1938) as The Fleet Captain
Kentucky (1938) as John Dillon – 1938
Homicide Bureau (1939) as Capt. Haines
Off the Record (1939) as Juvenal Court Judge
The Three Musketeers (1939) as Bailiff
Rose of Washington Square (1939) as Major Buck Russell
Sons of Liberty (1939, Short) as Robert Morris, Superintendent of Finance (uncredited)
Code of the Secret Service (1939) as The Friar
Susannah of the Mounties (1939) as Supt. Andrew Standing
Dust Be My Destiny (1939) as Slim Jones – Defense Attorney
Allegheny Uprising (1939) as Calhoon
That's Right—You're Wrong (1939) as Jonathan Forbes
Barricade (1939) as Shanghai Managing Editor
Invisible Stripes (1939) as The Warden
Brother Rat and a Baby (1940) as Maj. Terry
Virginia City (1940) as Dr. Robert Cameron
If I Had My Way (1940) as Mr. Blair
Brigham Young (1940) as Doc Richards
East of the River (1940) as Judge R.D. Davis
Life with Henry (1940) as Sylvanus Q. Sattherwaite
Santa Fe Trail (1940) as Robert E. Lee
Three Sons o' Guns (1941) as Philip Talbot
Dive Bomber (1941) as Senior Surgeon at San Diego
One Foot in Heaven (1941) as Dr. John Romer
Dangerously They Live (1941) as Mr. Goodwin
Nazi Agent (1942) as Brenner
Sundown Jim (1942) as Andrew Barr
Ship Ahoy (1942) as Inspector Davis (uncredited)
My Favorite Spy (1942) as Major Allen
The Glass Key (1942) as Ralph Henry
Mrs. Wiggs of the Cabbage Patch (1942) as Dr. Olcott
Reunion in France (1942) as Paul Grebeau
Air Force (1943) as Col. Blake
Mission to Moscow (1943) as Col. Faymonville
We've Never Been Licked (1943) as Commandant
Madame Curie (1943) as President of Businessman's Board (uncredited)
The Song of Bernadette (1943) as Chaplain (uncredited)
Buffalo Bill (1944) as Sen. Frederici
Ali Baba and the Forty Thieves (1944) as Caliph Hassan
Cobra Woman (1944) as MacDonald
Roger Touhy, Gangster (1944) as Riley
Thirty Seconds Over Tokyo (1944) as General (uncredited)
The Valley of Decision (1945) as Richard Kane (uncredited)
Pride of the Marines (1945) as Capt. Burroughs
Behind City Lights (1945) as Curtis Holbrook
Mildred Pierce (1945) as Inspector Peterson
Week-End at the Waldorf (1945) as House Detective Blake
Don't Fence Me In (1945) as Henry Bennett, aka Harry Benson
From This Day Forward (1946) as Tim Bagley (uncredited)
Night in Paradise (1946) as High Priest
The Walls Came Tumbling Down (1946) as Bishop Martin
Boys' Ranch (1946) as Judge Henderson
Notorious (1946) as Walter Beardsley
The Strange Woman (1946) as Rev. Thatcher
It's a Wonderful Life (1946) as Senior Angel (voice, uncredited)
The Beginning or the End (1947) as Dr. Arthur H. Compton
The Long Night (1947) as Chief of Police Bob McManus
Possessed (1947) as Dr. Ames
Life with Father (1947) as Dr. Humphries
Black Gold (1947) as Don Toland
That Hagen Girl (1947) as Trenton Gateley
High Wall (1947) as Dr. Philip Dunlap
Call Northside 777 (1948) as Parole Board Chairman
Up in Central Park (1948) as Big Jim Fitts
Command Decision (1948) as Congressman Stone
The Fountainhead (1949) as Chairman
Task Force (1949) as Adm. Ames
Samson and Delilah (1949) as Targil
Father of the Bride (1950) as Herbert Dunstan
Payment on Demand (1951) as Arnold Barton (uncredited)
Father's Little Dividend (1951) as Herbert Dunstan
No Questions Asked (1951) as Henry Manston
Submarine Command (1951) as Rear Adm. Joshua Rice
Lone Star (1952) as Sam Houston
At Sword's Point (1952) as Porthos
Washington Story (1952) as Speaker of the House
So This Is Love (1953) as Arnold Reuben (uncredited)
Marry Me Again (1953) as Mr. Courtney
The Long, Long Trailer (1954) as Mr. Tewitt
Sign of the Pagan (1954) as Pope Leo I

References

External links

 
 Moroni Olsen at Turner Classic Movies
 
 

1889 births
1954 deaths
20th-century American male actors
American male film actors
American male stage actors
Latter Day Saints from California
Latter Day Saints from Utah
Male Western (genre) film actors
Male actors from Utah
People from Ogden, Utah
University of Utah alumni
Weber State University alumni